Fluoromethane, also known as methyl fluoride, Freon 41, Halocarbon-41 and HFC-41, is a non-toxic, liquefiable, and flammable gas at standard temperature and pressure. It is made of carbon, hydrogen, and fluorine. The name stems from the fact that it is methane (CH4) with a fluorine atom substituted for one of the hydrogen atoms. It is used in semiconductor manufacturing processes as an etching gas in plasma etch reactors.

Composition 
The compound is the lowest mass member of the hydrofluorocarbon (HFC) family, compounds which contain only hydrogen, fluorine, and carbon. These compounds are related to the chlorofluorocarbons (CFC), but since they do not contain chlorine, are not destructive to the ozone layer. Fluorocarbons are, however, potent greenhouse gasses, and the Kigali Amendment to the Montreal Protocol is an attempt to phase them out due to their contribution to global warming.

The C−F bond energy is 552 kJ/mol and its length is 0.139 nm (typically 0.14 nm). Its molecular geometry is tetrahedral.

Its specific heat capacity (Cp) is 38.171 J·mol−1·K−1 at 25 °C. The critical point of fluoromethane is at 44.9 °C (318.1 K) and 6.280 MPa.

See also
Organofluorine chemistry
Halomethanes

References

External links 
 MSDS at Chemblink.com
 Data at Airliquide Encyclopedia
 Thermochemical data at chemnet.ru
 CAS DataBase List METHYL FLUORIDE at ChemicalBook

Fluoroalkanes
Halomethanes
Refrigerants
Gases